Donna Lee Mayhew (born June 20, 1960, in Dupont, Pennsylvania) is a retired female javelin thrower from the United States, who twice represented her native country at the Summer Olympics: 1988 and 1992. She set her personal best (63.66 metres) in 1988.

International competitions

References

1960 births
Living people
People from Luzerne County, Pennsylvania
Sportspeople from Pennsylvania
American female javelin throwers
Olympic track and field athletes of the United States
Athletes (track and field) at the 1988 Summer Olympics
Athletes (track and field) at the 1992 Summer Olympics
Pan American Games track and field athletes for the United States
Pan American Games medalists in athletics (track and field)
Athletes (track and field) at the 1991 Pan American Games
World Athletics Championships athletes for the United States
Pan American Games silver medalists for the United States
Medalists at the 1991 Pan American Games
21st-century American women